"Dallas" is the first single by Steely Dan. It was sung by drummer Jim Hodder. The song was not on the band's debut album Can't Buy a Thrill but was included on the 1978 Japan-only compilation Steely Dan. It was later recorded by Poco in 1975 on their Head Over Heels album.

Personnel
Donald Fagen – electric piano, piano, backing vocals
Walter Becker – bass guitar
Jeff Baxter – pedal steel guitar, guitars
Jim Hodder – drums, percussion, lead vocals
David Palmer – backing vocals
Tim Moore – backing vocals

References

1972 songs
Steely Dan songs
Songs written by Donald Fagen
Songs written by Walter Becker
ABC Records singles
1972 debut singles